Aleksey Vladimirovich Kuleshov (born 24 February 1979) is a former Russian volleyball player, a member of Russia men's national volleyball team. Currently he is a coach at Dynamo Moscow.

Kueshov was a member of the men's national team that won the silver medal at the 2000 Summer Olympics in Sydney, Australia. Playing as a middle-blocker he won the 2002 Volleyball World League with Russia, followed by a bronze at the 2004 Summer Olympics.

Sporting achievements

Clubs

CEV Champions League
  2002/2003 - with Belogorie Belgorod
  2003/2004 - with Belogorie Belgorod
  2006/2007 - with Dynamo Moscow
  2008/2009 - with Iskra Odintsovo
  2015/2016 - with Zenit Kazan

CEV Cup
  2009/2010 - with Iskra Odintsovo
  2013/2014 - with Guberniya Nizhniy Novgorod

CEV Challenge Cup
  2001/2002 - with Belogorie Belgorod

FIVB Club World Championship
  2015 - with Zenit Kazan

National championships
 1997/1998  Russian Championship, with Belogorie Belgorod
 1998/1999  Russian Championship, with Belogorie Belgorod
 1999/2000  Russian Championship, with Belogorie Belgorod
 2001/2002  Russian Cup 2002, with Belogorie Belgorod
 2001/2002  Russian Championship, with Belogorie Belgorod
 2002/2003  Russian Cup 2003, with Belogorie Belgorod
 2003/2004  Russian Cup 2004, with Belogorie Belgorod
 2003/2004  Russian Championship, with Belogorie Belgorod
 2004/2005  Russian Championship, with Dynamo Moscow
 2005/2006  Russian Cup 2006, with Dynamo Moscow
 2005/2006  Russian Championship, with Dynamo Moscow
 2006/2007  Russian Championship, with Dynamo Moscow
 2007/2008  Russian Championship, with Iskra Odintsovo
 2008/2009  Russian Championship, with Iskra Odintsovo
 2015/2016  Russian SuperCup 2015, with Zenit Kazan
 2015/2016  Russian Cup 2016, with Zenit Kazan
 2015/2016  Russian Championship, with Zenit Kazan

Individually
 2002 FIVB World League - Best Blocker
 2004 Russian Cup - Most Valuable Player
 2004 Russian Championship - Most Valuable Player
 2004 Olympic Games - Best Blocker
 2006 FIVB World Championship - Best Blocker

References

External links

 
 
 

1979 births
Living people
Russian men's volleyball players
Volleyball players at the 2000 Summer Olympics
Volleyball players at the 2004 Summer Olympics
Volleyball players at the 2008 Summer Olympics
Olympic volleyball players of Russia
Olympic silver medalists for Russia
Olympic bronze medalists for Russia
People from Fryazino
Olympic medalists in volleyball
Medalists at the 2008 Summer Olympics
Medalists at the 2004 Summer Olympics
Medalists at the 2000 Summer Olympics
Sportspeople from Moscow Oblast
20th-century Russian people
21st-century Russian people